The 1991–92 Divizia B was the 52nd season of the second tier of the Romanian football league system.

The format has been maintained to three series, each of them having 18 teams. At the end of the season, the winners of the series promoted to Divizia A and the last six places from each series relegated to Divizia C. The number of the relegated teams was increased due to reducing the number of the teams in the league from 54 to 36, starting with the next season.

Team changes

To Divizia B
Promoted from Divizia C
 Relonul Săvinești
 FEPA 74 Bârlad
 Petrolul Ianca
 Portul Constanța
 Metalul București
 Metrom Brașov
 Olt Scornicești
 Jiul IELIF Craiova
 Electromureș Târgu Mureș
 Minerul Cavnic
 CFR Cluj
 UM Timișoara

Relegated from Divizia A
 Jiul Petroșani
 Bihor Oradea
 Universitatea Cluj

From Divizia B
Relegated to Divizia C
 Siretul Pașcani
 Mecanică Fină București
 Vulturii Lugoj
 Prahova Ploiești
 Pandurii Târgu Jiu
 CIL Sighetu Marmației
 Poiana Câmpina
 Minerul Motru
 Aurul Brad
 Fortus Iași
 Montana Sinaia
 Progresul Timișoara

Promoted to Divizia A
 Oțelul Galați
 Electroputere Craiova
 ASA Electromureș Târgu Mureș

Renamed teams
Metalul București was renamed as Faur București.

Strungul Arad was renamed as Aris Arad.

Vagonul Arad was renamed as Astra Arad.

Teams

League tables

Serie I

Serie II

Serie III

Top scorers 

13 goals
  Costel Orac (Unirea Focșani)

11 goals
  Adrian Oprea (Gloria CFR Galați)

6 goals
  Gigi Ion (Universitatea Cluj)

4 goals
  Valentin Ștefan (Gloria CFR Galați)

See also
1991–92 Divizia A

References

1990
Rom
2